Astylidius is a monotypic longhorn beetle genus of the subfamily Lamiinae described by Thomas Lincoln Casey Jr. in 1913. Its only species, Astylidius parvus, was described by John Lawrence LeConte in 1873.

References

Acanthocinini
Monotypic Cerambycidae genera
Taxa named by Thomas Lincoln Casey Jr.